Gerrie is a Dutch and Afrikaans unisex given name. It is a diminutive of Ger, itself short for Gerard. As a birth name in the Netherlands, it is primarily feminine, peaking in popularities around 1950, but the name is more common as a nickname for men with the birth name Gerard(us) or Gerrit.

Men
 Gerrie Coetzee (born 1955), South African boxer
Gerrie Deijkers (1946–2003), Dutch footballer
Gerrie Eijlers (born 1980), Dutch handball player
 Gerrie Germishuys (born 1949), South African rugby player
 Gerrie Kleton (1953-2006), Dutch footballer
 Gerrie Knetemann (1951-2004), Dutch cyclist
 Gerrie Labuschagné (born 1995), South African rugby player
 Gerrie Mühren (born 1946), Dutch footballer
 Gerrie Nel (born 1961), South African lawyer and prosecutor
 Gerrie Pienaar (born 1959), South African cricket umpire
 Gerrie Slabber, South African rugby player
 Gerrie Slot (born 1954), Dutch track cyclist
 Gerrie Snyman (born 1981), Namibian cricketer
Women
 Gerrie Hammond (died 1992), Canadian politician (Geraldine)
  (born 1970), Dutch comics artist and writer
  (born 1955), Belgian screenwriter

References

Unisex given names
Masculine given names
Feminine given names
Dutch masculine given names
Dutch feminine given names